The Minnesota–Wisconsin football rivalry is an American college football rivalry between the Minnesota Golden Gophers and Wisconsin Badgers. It is the most-played rivalry in the NCAA Division I Football Bowl Subdivision, with 132 meetings between the two teams. The winner of the game receives Paul Bunyan's Axe, a tradition that started in 1948 after the first trophy, the Slab of Bacon, disappeared after the 1943 game when the Badgers were supposed to turn it over to the Golden Gophers. Minnesota and Wisconsin first played in 1890 and have met every year since, except for 1906. The series is tied 62–62–8 through 2022.
Wisconsin took the series lead for the first time after defeating Minnesota 31–0 in the 2017 game; Minnesota had led the overall series since 1902, at times by as many as 20 games.

The rivalry game is sometimes known as the Border Battle.

History

The rivalry was first played in 1890 on Minnesota's campus, in Minneapolis, resulting in a 63–0 Minnesota victory. Theron Lyman led Wisconsin to its first win over Minnesota in 1894. The game became a conference rivalry with the creation of the Western Conference (later the Big Ten Conference) in 1896. In 1906, President Theodore Roosevelt suspended college football rivalry games for safety concerns, due to player injuries and fatalities on the field. It is the single year the two teams did not play each other. Subsequently, it is now the longest uninterrupted rivalry in FBS Division 1 college football. The game has never been played in any city besides Minneapolis, and Madison, Wisconsin. 

From 1933 to 1982, it was traditionally the final game of the regular season for both schools. It has resumed being a season finale as of 2014, following the Big Ten's new divisional alignment and schedule for the final weekend of conference play. 

The 2014 and 2019 games decided the Big Ten West champion; Wisconsin defeated Minnesota 34–24 to go to the 2014 Big Ten Football Championship Game against Ohio State.  In 2019, Wisconsin defeated Minnesota 38–17 to go to the 2019 Big Ten Football Championship Game against Ohio State. The last time the rivalry determined a Big Ten Conference champion was in 1962 when #3 Wisconsin defeated #5 Minnesota for a berth to the 1963 Rose Bowl.

Wisconsin won 14 straight meetings against Minnesota, from 2004 to 2017, before the Gophers beat the Badgers in their 2018 matchup. It ended the longest losing streak for either team in the history of the rivalry.

Trophies

Slab of Bacon
The rivalry's first trophy was the "Slab of Bacon", in use from 1930 to 1943. Created by R. B. Fouch of Minneapolis, it is a piece of black walnut wood with a football at the center bearing a letter that becomes "M" or "W" depending on which way the trophy is hung. The word "BACON" is carved at both ends, implying that the winner has "brought home the bacon." The trophy's tenure ended when Minnesota's 1943 victory in Minnesota led to the fans rushing the field. Wisconsin student Peg Watrous was to bring the trophy to a Minnesota representative after the game, but could not find her in the commotion, and subsequently lost track of the "bacon". Reportedly, the trophy was sent to Minnesota's locker room, but coach George Hauser refused it, suggesting such traditions be held off until after World War II. It was subsequently lost; a new trophy, "Paul Bunyan's Axe", was introduced in 1948.

The trophy was "lost" for over 50 years. In 1992, Wisconsin coach Barry Alvarez joked that "we took home the bacon, and kept it." In 1994, Wisconsin intern Will Roleson found it in an old storage closet at Camp Randall Stadium. It had evidently been maintained for some time, as game scores through 1970 were painted on the back. It is now displayed at the Camp Randall Stadium football offices.

Trophy record (1930-1943): Minnesota, 11–3

Paul Bunyan's Axe

The Paul Bunyan Axe was created by the Wisconsin letterwinners' organization (the National W Club) and would be instituted as the trophy in the series in 1948. The scores of each game are recorded on the axe's handle, which is 6 feet long.  A new axe was created in 2000. The original axe was donated to the College Football Hall of Fame in 2003.

Until 2014, when the game ended, if the team holding the trophy won, they would run to their own sideline, take the axe and carry it around the field and "chop down" one or both goal posts. If the team not holding the axe won, they were allowed to run to their opponents' sideline and "steal" the axe. The tradition was changed in 2014, with the Axe now kept off the field until the game is over. This change was in response to a near skirmish in 2013 in which the Minnesota players surrounded their goal post and would not permit the Wisconsin players to ceremonially chop it down. The usual tradition was restored in 2015, with Wisconsin winning again 31–21.

Trophy record: Wisconsin, 45–27–3 [Through 2022]

Accomplishments by the two rivals

Game results

See also 

 List of NCAA college football rivalry games
 List of most-played college football series in NCAA Division I
 Packers–Vikings rivalry
 Minnesota–Wisconsin ice hockey rivalry

References

External links

 Wisconsin Badgers history of Paul Bunyan's Axe

College football rivalries in the United States
Minnesota Golden Gophers football
Wisconsin Badgers football
Big Ten Conference rivalries